Suravajhala Sudhakar (born 19 November 1960), known by his stage name Subhalekha Sudhakar, is an Indian actor who works in Telugu and Tamil language films and television. Sudhakar's first Telugu film Subhalekha (1982) gained him wide recognition through which he obtained his screen name. He went onto appear in a variety of roles in films such as Rendu Jella Sita (1983), Sitaara (1984), Siva (1989), Prema Zindabad (1990), Nirnayam (1991), Chitram Bhalare Vichitram (1991), Nesam (1997), Dongaata (1997), Chinnabbayi (1997), and Aa Naluguru (2004).

Sudhakar has appeared in over 150 films in Telugu, in addition to a few in Tamil. Following his stint in cinema, he subsequently moved to television. Some of his notable television series in Tamil include Chithi, Anni, Kolangal and Thendral. He has received the Nandi TV Award for the Telugu serial Mamathala Kovela. He also received an award for Thendral where he acted as a disabled person.

Early life and career
Sudhakar was born as Suravajhala Sudhakar on 19 November 1960. After completing his graduation, Sudhakar moved to Madras to pursue a full time career in films. He gave several auditions and was selected for K. Viswanath's film Subhalekha. While shooting for the film, he also shot for the Tamil film Thunai (1982) which released earlier. However, he gained recognition among the Telugu audience with Subhalekha, thereby gaining his screen name "Subhalekha" Sudhakar.

Subhalekha Sudhakar has acted in more than 100 films, including a few Tamil films as well. He is noted for his comical and supporting actor roles.

Personal life
He married playback singer S. P. Sailaja, sister of noted singer and actor S. P. Balasubrahmanyam in December 1989, and the couple has a son.

Filmography

Telugu films

Tamil films

Notable films as dubbing artist

Television

References

External links
 

Male actors in Telugu cinema
Indian male film actors
Telugu comedians
Living people
1960 births
20th-century Indian male actors
21st-century Indian male actors
Male actors in Tamil cinema
Male actors in Hindi cinema
Place of birth missing (living people)
Nandi Award winners
Male actors in Telugu television
Indian male television actors
Tamil male television actors
People from Visakhapatnam
People from Uttarandhra